The prime minister of Azerbaijan is the head of government of Azerbaijan.  The current prime minister is Ali Asadov on 8 October 2019 after the removal of his predecessor, Novruz Mammadov.

Due to the central role of the president in the political system, the activities of the executive branch (including the prime minister) are significantly influenced by the head of state (for example, it is the president who appoints and dismisses the Prime Minister and other members of the Government; the president may chair the meetings of the cabinet and give obligatory orders to the prime minister and other members of the Government, the president may also revoke any act of the Government).

Historical background 
In the era of the Soviet Union, the head of government was the chairman of Council of People's Commissars (until 1946) and the chairman of the Council of Ministers (after 1946). People who held those positions are sometimes referred to as the prime ministers. They may have also been referred to as Premier of Ministers, or simply premier.

Succession of the presidency
The prime minister is the third-highest constitutional office in Azerbaijan. In the event of the president's death, resignation or impeachment, the prime minister is second in the line of succession, after the first vice-president. Until September 2016, when the office of First Vice-President was created, the prime minister was first in line.

List of heads of government of Azerbaijan (1918–present)

Azerbaijan Democratic Republic (1918–1920)
Prime ministers

Transcaucasian Socialist Federative Soviet Republic (1922–1936) and Azerbaijan Soviet Socialist Republic (1936–1991)
Chairmen of the Council of People's Commissars

Chairmen of the Council of Ministers

Republic of Azerbaijan (1991–present)
Prime ministers

See also
 Prime Minister of the Nakhchivan Autonomous Republic
 President of Azerbaijan
 List of heads of state of Azerbaijan
 Ministry of Defense of Azerbaijan

References

Azerbaijan
 
Government of Azerbaijan
1991 establishments in Azerbaijan